Ángel Fernández Pérez (born 16 September 1988) is a Spanish handball player for Limoges Handball and the Spanish national team.

He participated at the 2017 World Men's Handball Championship.

Individual awards
 All Star Team as Best Left Wing at the 2023 World Championship

References

External links

1988 births
Living people
Spanish male handball players
Liga ASOBAL players
Handball players from Cantabria
Expatriate handball players
Expatriate handball players in Poland
Spanish expatriate sportspeople in Poland
Spanish expatriate sportspeople in France
Vive Kielce players
CB Cantabria players
Mediterranean Games bronze medalists for Spain
Mediterranean Games medalists in handball
Competitors at the 2018 Mediterranean Games
Handball players at the 2020 Summer Olympics
Medalists at the 2020 Summer Olympics
Olympic bronze medalists for Spain
Olympic medalists in handball
21st-century Spanish people